Immortalized is the second album by 3X Krazy. It was released on June 22, 1999 for Big Block Records and Champeli Entertainment and featured production from Tone Capone, Big Deion, DJ Daryll, One Drop Scott and Numskull.

Track listing 
"The Real" (featuring Suga Bear, Reddy B & Lil Dank) – 5:26
"The Sickness" – 3:52
"Bad Boyz" (featuring Burnie & Mob Figaz) – 5:24
"Friday" – 3:54
"Pimp Till I Can't Breath" (featuring Eternal) – 4:35
"Maria" – 5:44
"Kaviealstars" (featuring C-Bo, Otis & Shug) – 4:04
"Eliminations" – 4:23
"Death Call" – 4:18
"Bloodrush" – 4:25
"Reactions" – 4:52
"Immortalize" (featuring Mob Figaz) – 4:58
"Panties-Na-Knot" (featuring Swoop G & 2 Scoops) – 4:31
"Murder & Kamikaze" (featuring Swoop G & Eklipze) – 4:03
"Fuck Wit Dis" (featuring Lil Tigger) – 4:28
"Gaffled Remix" (featuring 2Pac, Eklipze & B N T) – 4:52

References

1999 albums
3X Krazy albums